A volleyball is a ball used to play indoor volleyball, beach volleyball, or other less common variations of the sport. Volleyballs are round and traditionally consist of eighteen nearly rectangular panels of synthetic or genuine leather, arranged in six identical sections of three panels each, wrapped around a bladder.  A valve permits the internal air pressure to be adjusted. In a break from the traditional construction, in 2008, the FIVB adopted as its official indoor ball a new Mikasa with dimples and only eight panels for a softer touch and truer flight.

Volleyball characteristics
Indoor volleyballs are designed for the indoor version of the sport, and beach volleyballs for the beach game.  

Indoor volleyballs may be solid white or the brightest shade of yellow.  They are made in two versions: the youth version is slightly smaller and weighs much less than an adult volleyball, and a heavier medicine ball type that allows setters to strengthen their fingers. 

Beach volleyballs are slightly larger than standard indoor balls, have a rougher external texture, and a lower internal pressure.  They can be brightly colored or solid white.
The very first volleyballs were made from leather paneling over a rubber carcass.

Major brands 

There are several brands of competitive volleyballs in use, including, but not limited to:

 Tachikara
 Molten
Allsix
Copaya
 Wilson
 Baden Sports
 Mikasa
 Mizuno
 Nike
 Spalding
 Beta
 Gala (made in Czech Republic)

Most of these brands also make cheaper variations for recreational (non-competitive) use.

Adopted use 
Mikasa makes the official balls of the Fédération Internationale de Volleyball and the CEV - European Volleyball Confederation (beach and indoor).
Molten makes the official ball of USA Volleyball.
Molten makes the official ball of NCAA Volleyball (indoor).
Wilson makes the official ball of the Association of Volleyball Professionals (beach).

See also 
Official ball supplier
List of inflatable manufactured goods

References

External links 
CEV and Mikasa unveil new Champions League volleyball in Vienna
CEV Website - Confederation Europeenne de Volleyball

Balls
Volleyball terminology
Inflatable manufactured goods